Halloween is a 2002 children's book written by Jerry Seinfeld and illustrated by James Bennett.

Adapted from Seinfeld's "Halloween" stand-up routine from his 1998 comedy special I'm Telling You for the Last Time, the book is a humorous description of an American Halloween from a child's point of view, from bad trick-or-treat candy to pajama-like costumes, based on the author's childhood experiences.

References

2002 children's books
American picture books
Halloween children's books